Tom Glenn High School, commonly known as Glenn High School or simply GHS, is a high school located in Leander, Texas. It opened in the 2016–2017 school year as the sixth high school of Leander Independent School District. 
As of 2016, the school is the northern most high school in the district. The school (as of 2016) is the district's newest school, and the school started with freshmen and sophomores for the first school year.

Namesake
The school was named after Tom Glenn, a former superintendent of Leander ISD.

Crest

References

External links
Glenn High School Homepage

Leander Independent School District high schools
High schools in Williamson County, Texas
Educational institutions established in 2016
2016 establishments in Texas